Franklin County is a county located in the state of Maine, in the United States. As of the 2020 census, the population was 29,456, making it the second-least populous county in Maine. Its county seat is Farmington. The county was established on May 9, 1838 and named for Benjamin Franklin.

History
Franklin County was formed on 9 May 1838 from portions of Kennebec, Oxford and Somerset counties. Smaller adjustments were made during the following fourteen years.

Geography
The county high point is Sugarloaf Mountain, the ski mountain in Carrabassett Valley whose elevation is 4237 feet.

Adjacent counties and municipalities
Somerset County – northeast
Kennebec County – southeast
Androscoggin County – south
Oxford County – southwest
Le Granit Regional County Municipality, Quebec – northwest

Demographics

2015
As of 2015 the largest self-reported ancestry groups in Franklin County, Maine are:

2000 census
As of the census of 2000, there were 29,467 people, 11,806 households, and 7,744 families living in the county.  The population density was 17 people per square mile (7/km2).  There were 19,159 housing units at an average density of 11 per square mile (4/km2).  The racial makeup of the county was 97.96% White, 0.24% Black or African American, 0.37% Native American, 0.43% Asian, 0.02% Pacific Islander, 0.17% from other races, and 0.81% from two or more races.  0.54% of the population were Hispanic or Latino of any race. 26.3% were of English, 13.8% United States or American, 12.2% French, 9.2% Irish, 7.9% French Canadian, and 5.3% Scottish ancestry according to Census 2000. 95.7% spoke English and 2.9% French as their first language.

There were 11,806 households, out of which 29.50% had children under the age of 18 living with them, 52.40% were married couples living together, 9.20% had a female householder with no husband present, and 34.40% were non-families. 25.80% of all households were made up of individuals, and 10.50% had someone living alone who was 65 years of age or older.  The average household size was 2.40 and the average family size was 2.88.

In the county, the population was spread out, with 23.50% under the age of 18, 11.10% from 18 to 24, 26.40% from 25 to 44, 24.80% from 45 to 64, and 14.20% who were 65 years of age or older.  The median age was 38 years. For every 100 females there were 93.40 males.  For every 100 females age 18 and over, there were 89.20 males.

The median income for a household in the county was $31,459, and the median income for a family was $37,863. Males had a median income of $30,475 versus $20,442 for females. The per capita income for the county was $15,796.  About 10.70% of families and 14.60% of the population were below the poverty line, including 17.90% of those under age 18 and 9.50% of those age 65 or over.

2010 census
As of the 2010 United States Census, there were 30,768 people, 13,000 households, and 8,129 families living in the county. The racial makeup of the county was 97.3% white, 0.4% Asian, 0.4% American Indian, 0.2% black or African American, 0.2% from other races, and 1.4% from two or more races. Those of Hispanic or Latino origin made up 1.0% of the population. In terms of ancestry, 23.3% were English, 14.2% were Irish, 7.7% were French Canadian, 7.5% were German, 6.4% were Scottish, and 5.0% were American.

Of the 13,000 households, 26.2% had children under the age of 18 living with them, 48.6% were married couples living together, 9.4% had a female householder with no husband present, 37.5% were non-families, and 28.9% of all households were made up of individuals. The average household size was 2.28 and the average family size was 2.76. The median age was 43.4 years.

The median income for a household in the county was $39,831 and the median income for a family was $48,634. Males had a median income of $38,563 versus $30,024 for females. The per capita income for the county was $20,838. About 10.2% of families and 15.5% of the population were below the poverty line, including 21.2% of those under age 18 and 8.8% of those age 65 or over.

Politics

Voter registration

|}

Government
Franklin County is governed by a three-member county commission. Commissioners meet at 10am on the first and third Monday of each month and are elected in the November general election, serving four year terms. Currently, the three commissioners are:

District One: Gary McGrane (Jay, Wilton, Temple, Carthage)

District Two: Charles Webster (Farmington, Chesterville, New Sharon)

District Three: Clyde Barker (Avon, Carrabassett Valley, Coplin Plantation, Dallas Plantation, Eustis, Industry, Kingfield, New Vineyard, Phillips, Rangeley Plantation, Rangeley, Sandy River Plantation, Strong, Weld, and unorganized territories of East Central Franklin, North Franklin, South Franklin, West Central Franklin and Wyman)

Commissioner Charles Webster was appointed by Governor Paul LePage in 2015 to serve out the rest of Fred Hardy's term, who died on July 4. Webster and Barker are members of the Republican Party, while McGrane belongs to the Democratic Party.

Franklin County belongs to Maine Prosecutorial District Three, which is composed of Franklin, Oxford and Androscoggin Counties. The current district attorney is Andrew S. Robinson, of Farmington who was elected to his first term in 2014. The deputy district attorney is James A. Andrews, who was appointed to that post by Robinson in 2015.

The current county treasurer is Pamela Prodan. She was elected to that position in 2014 and will serve a four term through December 2018. Prodan succeed Mary Frank, who decided to retire instead of run for a second term. The duties of county treasurer include, overseeing fiscal accounting matters, including paying bills, collecting amounts owed the County, reserve/investment accounts, maintaining the County's financial records and other matters related to the County's finances.

Law enforcement
Only five municipalities in Franklin County have their own police department (Carrabassett Valley, Farmington, Jay, Rangeley, and Wilton). The Franklin County Sheriff's Department is responsible for patrol and emergency calls in the remaining communities in the county without their own agency. The current sheriff is Scott Nichols, of New Sharon. Nichols was elected to that post in November 2012, defeating incumbent sheriff, Dennis Pike. Pike had spent 46 years in Franklin County law enforcement prior to being defeated by Nichols.

The status of the Franklin County Jail has been contentiously debated issue within the county and state for several years. In 2008, Governor John Baldacci signed into law a bill which consolidated county jails in an effort to reduce costs. As a result, the Franklin County jail was designated a 72-hour holding facility. Any inmates who needed to be held longer than the three-day maximum had to be transported to the Somerset County Jail in East Madison, which county jail officials said was a waste of department time and money. Jail consolidation has also led to jail overcrowding statewide. When the Somerset Jail reached its maximum capacity, inmates were forced to be transported to another jail within the state, sometimes hours away which Franklin County officials again said wasted time and money.

In 2012, the Somerset County Commissioners voted not to accept any more inmates from outside the county as the state Board of Corrections withheld its third quarter payment. While the vote allowed current inmates to stay at the jail, it required all future inmates to be sent to Two Bridges Regional Jail in Wiscasset. In 2013, the Maine Legislature's Public Safety and Criminal Justice Committee voted 11-0 to allow the Franklin County jail to return to full service status.

In 2014, the Franklin County Commissioners voted to withhold all payments to the state for jail inmates. Public outrage over the jail issue also pressured the state to give the county full service rights. In 2014 an 800-member Facebook group was created and several protests were staged in front of the county courthouse. In 2015, the State Board of Corrections voted to grant the county a fully operational jail, officially ending the seven year conflict between the county and the state.

Communities

Towns

Avon
Carrabassett Valley
Carthage
Chesterville
Eustis
Farmington
Industry
Jay
Kingfield
New Sharon
New Vineyard
Phillips
Rangeley
Strong
Temple
Weld
Wilton

Plantations
Coplin Plantation
Dallas Plantation
Rangeley Plantation
Sandy River Plantation

Census-designated places
Chisholm
Farmington
Kingfield
Rangeley
Wilton

Unorganized territories
East Central Franklin
North Franklin
South Franklin
West Central Franklin
Wyman

Unincorporated communities
Dryden
East Dixfield
East Wilton
Farmington Falls
Freeman
Macy
Madrid
Mooselookmeguntic
North Jay
Oquossoc

See also
National Register of Historic Places listings in Franklin County, Maine

References

External links
 http://www.franklincountymaine.org/ Franklin County Chamber of Commerce
Franklin County on Maine.gov

 

 
Maine counties
1838 establishments in Maine
Populated places established in 1838